Catharina Sperling-Heckel (10 April 1699 - 28 May 1741) was a German miniature painter, etcher and engraver.

Life and work

Catharina Heckel was born in April 1699 in Augsburg. Her father was Michael Heckel. He was a goldsmith and taught Heckel how to paint and draw. She was taught engraving by Johann Ulrich Kraus. She married Hieronymus Sperling in 1725. In 1728, she painted a miniature portrait of Charles Edward Stuart. She died from complications from childbirth, within weeks of the birth of her first child, in May 1741.

Notable collections

Moses' arms grow heavy as he prays for the victory of the Israelites over the Amalecites; an outstretched arm is anatomically depicted, c. 1735, Wellcome Collection

Gallery

References

1699 births
1741 deaths
Engravers from Augsburg
German women painters
Portrait miniaturists
German etchers
Deaths in childbirth
Women etchers
Women engravers